The 1999–2000 Czech Cup was the seventh season of the annual football knock-out tournament of the Czech Republic. Winners Slovan Liberec qualified for the 2000–01 UEFA Cup.

Teams

Preliminary round
44 teams took part in the preliminary round.

|}

Round 1
74 teams entered the competition at this stage. Along with the 22 winners from the preliminary round, these teams played 48 matches to qualify for the second round.

|}

Round 2

|}

Round 3

|}

Round 4
Čelákovice were the only team from the fourth level to take part in round 4.

|}

Quarterfinals
The quarterfinals were played on 12 April 2000.

|}

Semifinals
The semifinals were played on 2 and 3 May 2000.

|}

Final

See also
 1999–2000 Czech First League
 1999–2000 Czech 2. Liga

References

External links
 Official site 
 Czech Republic Cup 1999/2000 at RSSSF.com

1999–2000
1999–2000 domestic association football cups
Cup